Alexander Shvets (born 29 June 1972) is a former professional tennis player from Belarus. He is also known as Alexander Shvec.

Biography
Shvets, a right-handed player from Minsk, represented Belarus in a total of 19 Davis Cup ties, the first in 1994. In a World Group qualifying tie against Switzerland in 2000 he suffered the ignominy of being beaten 0–6, 0–6 by Michel Kratochvil. He finally got an opportunity to play in the World Group in 2004, his final year of Davis Cup tennis. A veteran of the team at 31, Shvets featured in the doubles rubber of Belarus's opening fixture against Russia at home in Minsk. He and partner Max Mirnyi were beaten by Marat Safin and Mikhail Youzhny, but Belarus went on to win the tie and ultimately make the semi-finals, although Shvets took no further part in their campaign. He finished his career with a 13/13 overall record, 11/9 in singles.

On the ATP Tour, Shvets appeared in the main draw of three singles tournament, the 1996 St. Petersburg Open, the 1999 President's Cup in Tashkent and the 2002 St. Petersburg Open. He was runner-up at the Bukhara Challenger in 2000 and also made two doubles finals at Challenger level.

ATP Challenger and ITF Futures finals

Singles: 7 (5–2)

Doubles: 5 (2–3)

See also
List of Belarus Davis Cup team representatives

References

External links
 
 
 

1972 births
Living people
Belarusian male tennis players
Tennis players from Minsk